Cayuga Park is a neighborhood park and playground in San Francisco, at the edge of the Cayuga Terrace neighborhood. Its history, location and aesthetics make it unique among the parks of San Francisco.

The aesthetics of Cayuga Park is largely the creation of Demetrio Braceros, an employee of the San Francisco Recreation and Park Department. Braceros worked on the park for over 20 years, transforming a barren landscape into a park that features lush vegetation, trails, "themed gardens" and, most prominently, over 375 figurines, totem poles and statues as well as several observation decks, all carved from wood by Braceros.

After emigrating from the Philippines in 1973, Braceros worked for a San Francisco law firm but soon applied for a job as a gardener at the Recreation and Park Department. In 1986, Braceros was assigned to the  Cayuga Park, with the mission to "change the atmosphere."

Braceros said about the state of the park when he took it on, "there were prostitutes, drug dealers and crime. People got killed up there ... I thought to myself, how can I help this place?"

Notes

Parks in San Francisco
Culture of San Francisco
Naïve art
Art in San Francisco
Mission District, San Francisco